Leninsky District is an administrative district (raion), one of the twenty-three in Tula Oblast, Russia. It is located in the northern central part of the oblast. Its administrative center is the rural locality (a settlement) of Leninsky. Population: 63,355 (2010 Census);  The population of the administrative center accounts for 11.1% of the district's total population.

Administrative and municipal status
Within the framework of administrative divisions, Leninsky District is one of the twenty-three in the oblast. The rural locality (a settlement) of Leninsky serves as its administrative center.

As a municipal division, the territory of the administrative district and the territory of the Tula City Under Oblast Jurisdiction are incorporated together as Tula Urban Okrug.

References

Notes

Sources



Districts of Tula Oblast